Marinella Falca is a former Italian gymnast born in Giovinazzo on 1 May 1986.

Biography
She won the silver medal in the competition of rhythmic gymnastics group at Athens Olympics in 2004. She finished 4th in the same event at the 2008 Summer Olympics. She won also eight medals at the World Championships (one gold at Baku 2005), and eight at the European Championships (one gold at Turin 2008).

Olympic results

Honours
 Officer: Ufficiale Ordine al Merito della Repubblica Italiana: 27 September 2004

See also
Italy at the 2004 Summer Olympics - Medalists

References

External links
 
 Gymnast profile at the FIG web site
 Gymnast profile at the CONI web site

Living people
1986 births
Olympic gymnasts of Italy
Gymnasts of Centro Sportivo Aeronautica Militare
Olympic medalists in gymnastics
Olympic silver medalists for Italy
Italian rhythmic gymnasts
Gymnasts at the 2004 Summer Olympics
Gymnasts at the 2008 Summer Olympics
Medalists at the 2004 Summer Olympics
Medalists at the Rhythmic Gymnastics European Championships
Medalists at the Rhythmic Gymnastics World Championships